Jean Williams Cacicedo (born 1948) is an American clothing designer, artist and instructor based in Berkeley, California. She is best known for her multi-media coats with designs inspired by myths, symbolic imagery, and spiritual journeys. She has been involved in the art to wear movement. Cacicedo is also recognized in the fiber arts community for her decorative wall pieces that are crafted from wool, linen, and other fibers.

Cacicedo received a B.F.A. from Pratt Institute. She teaches out of her studio and has been a visiting artist at California College of Arts, Penland School of Arts and Crafts, and Split Rock Arts Program at the University of Minnesota. Cacicedo's work is held by the de Young Museum and the Museum of Arts and Design.

References

Further reading
Jean Williams Cacicedo: Explorations in cloth [Paperback] 
Jean Williams Cacicedo (Author) Paperback: 48 pages 
Publisher: Museum of Craft & Folk Art; F First Edition (2000) 
Language: English

External links
Jean Cacicedo website
Jean Cacicedo website bio

1948 births
Living people
American fashion designers
American women fashion designers
Pratt Institute alumni
21st-century American women